Narra Venkateswara Rao  was an Indian actor known for his works in Telugu cinema. He hailed from Agraharam village (Ramachandrapuram) in Zarugumalli Mandal, Prakasam district of Andhra Pradesh, India.

Career
He acted in over 500 films spanning more than three decades. Some of his hit films include Yuvatharam Kadilindi (1980), Neti Bharatam (1983), Kartavyam (1990), and Osey Ramulamma (1997). His last film was Mesthri (2009).

Death
Rao died of cancer on 27 December 2009 at the age of 62 years.

Filmography

 Chaduvu Samskaram (1974)
 Shri Vinayaka Vijayamu (1979) as Indra
 Yuvatharam Kadilindi (1980)
 Prema Kanuka (1981)
 Chattamtho Poratam (1985) as Inspector
 Nireekshana (1986) as ArjunaRao Inspector
 Pratighatana (1986)
 Repati Pourulu (1986)
 Jayam Manade (1986) as Public Prosecutor
 Dharmapatni (1987)
 Rowdy No.1 (1988) as Sub-Inspector of Police
 Bharata Nari (1989)
 Palnati Rudraiah (1989) as Lakshmipathi
 Kartavyam (1990) as Defence Lawyer
 Yerra Mandaram (1991)
 Peddarikam (1992)
 Lathi (1992) as Police Constable
 Antham / Drohi (1992)
 Cheemala Dandu (1994)
 Gang Master (1994)
 Erra Sainyam (1994)
 Big Boss (1995)
 Orey Rikshaw (1995)
 Osey Ramulamma (1997) as Ramaswamy
 Kante Koothurne Kanu (1998)
 Pavitra Prema (1998)
 Tholi Prema (1998)
 Mannavaru Chinnavaru (1999; Tamil)
 Suryudu(2000)
 Adavi Chukka (2000) as Venkayya
 Ennavale (2000; Tamil)
 Chinna (2001)
 Snehamante Idera (2001)
 Indra (2002) as Superintendent of Police
 Varsham (2004) as Home Minister
 Chanti (2004) as MLA's father-in-law
 Adirindhayya Chandram (2005) as Sivaji Father
 Nuvvostanante Nenoddantana (2005) as Muddu Krishnaiyya
 Veerabhadra (2006)
 Operation Duryodhana (2007)
 Aatadista (2008)
 Mesthri (2009)

See also
 Telugu language
 Telugu films
 Prakasam district
 Kamma (caste)

References

2009 deaths
Telugu male actors
People from Prakasam district
Year of birth missing
Indian male film actors